Kobi Moyal (born June 12, 1987) is an Israeli footballer. 

He played for Beitar Jerusalem, Hapoel Kfar Saba, Bnei Yehuda, Sheriff Tiraspol, Maccabi Haifa and American club New York Cosmos.

Career
Moyal played in the youth system of Beitar Jerusalem until 2006. Moyal joined the senior team at 2006–07 season, and won the championship, while concurrently with the youth team won the double.

Moyal was loaned to Hapoel Kfar Saba at 2007–08 season and on 2008–09 season to Bnei Yehuda Tel Aviv. On 2009–10 Israeli Premier League season returned to Beitar Jerusalem.

On August 12, 2013 signed Moyal one year with an option for another year in Sheriff Tiraspol. Moyal played one season, won the championship and was chosen to the Midfielder of the year in Moldova.

On 15 May 2014 he got his first call-up to the Israel national football team towards the games against Mexico and Honduras.

On 21 July 2014, Moyal signed for two years in Maccabi Haifa.

On 16 June 2016, Moyal came back to Beitar Jerusalem for one year. On 12 June 2017, after 13 league games in Beitar, Moyal was released from the team.

He later signed for the New York Cosmos.

Honours

Club

Beitar Jerusalem
Israeli Championships (1): 2006–07
Toto Cup (1): 2009–10

Sheriff Tiraspol
Divizia Naţională (1): 2013–14
 Super cup Moldova 
Maccabi Haifa
Israel State Cup (1): 2015–16

References

External links
 

1987 births
Living people
Israeli Jews
Israeli footballers
Beitar Jerusalem F.C. players
Hapoel Kfar Saba F.C. players
Bnei Yehuda Tel Aviv F.C. players
FC Sheriff Tiraspol players
Maccabi Haifa F.C. players
New York Cosmos (2010) players
Hapoel Katamon Jerusalem F.C. players
F.C. Holon Yermiyahu players
Israeli Premier League players
Moldovan Super Liga players
North American Soccer League players
Liga Leumit players
Israeli settlers
Israeli expatriate footballers
Expatriate footballers in Moldova
Expatriate soccer players in the United States
Israeli expatriate sportspeople in Moldova
Israeli expatriate sportspeople in the United States
Israeli people of Moroccan-Jewish descent
Footballers from Ma'ale Adumim
Association football midfielders